FC Botev Krivodol (ФК Ботев Криводол) is a Bulgarian football club from the town of Krivodol, currently playing in the North-West V AFG, the third division of Bulgarian football. Its home matches take place at the Hristo Botev Stadium.

Honours
North-West V AFG
Winners: 2007-08
 Tenth place in the Western "B" group: 2008/09
 1/4 finalist in the National Cup Tournament: at that time the official name is the Cup of Bulgaria - 2008/09

History
The club was officially founded in 1924 under the name Levski. In 1957 the club called Botev. Club colors are green and black. 

During 2007–2008 season the team took first place in Bulgarian North-West V AFG, thus qualified in the Bulgarian B Professional Football Group for the upcoming season.

Season 2008-09 is a first for the club for all time in Bulgarian professional football. Botev Krivodol qualified at the 1/8 finals of the Bulgarian Cup 2008-09 after defeating Beroe Stara Zagora with 1:0 and beating surprisingly elite Slavia Sofia with 2:1 to make it to the 1/8 finals of the competition. At the 1/8 finals the draw met Botev Krivodol with Rodopa Smolyan. The match took place at Smolyan and Botev Krivodol surprisingly beat Rodopa with 1:3 and qualified for the first time at the 1/4 finals of the tournament.

Botev season performances
2005-06: North-West V AFG (10th)
2006-07: North-West V AFG (6th)
2007-08: North-West V AFG (1st Promotion)
2008-09: B PFG (10th)
2009-10: B PFG (13th)

Current squad 
As of September 13, 2011

References

External links 
 Botev Krivodol at bgclubs.eu

 
Football clubs in Bulgaria
1924 establishments in Bulgaria
Association football clubs established in 1924